Panaxytriol is a fatty alcohol found in ginseng.

References

Triols
Fatty alcohols
Conjugated diynes
Vicinal diols